Otopharynx is a genus of haplochromine cichlids endemic to Lake Malawi in Eastern Africa.

Species
There are currently 14 recognized species in this genus:
 Otopharynx antron Cleaver, Konings & Stauffer, 2009
 Otopharynx argyrosoma (Regan, 1922)
 Otopharynx auromarginatus (Boulenger, 1908) (Golden-margined hap)
 Otopharynx brooksi M. K. Oliver, 1989
 Otopharynx decorus (Trewavas, 1935)
 Otopharynx heterodon (Trewavas, 1935) (Royal blue hap)
 Otopharynx lithobates M. K. Oliver, 1989
 Otopharynx ovatus (Trewavas, 1935)
 Otopharynx pachycheilus Arnegard & Snoeks, 2001
 Otopharynx selenurus Regan, 1922
 Otopharynx speciosus (Trewavas, 1935)
 Otopharynx spelaeotes Cleaver, Konings & Stauffer, 2009
 Otopharynx tetraspilus (Trewavas, 1935)
 Otopharynx tetrastigma (Günther, 1894)

References

 
Haplochromini

Cichlid genera
Taxa named by Charles Tate Regan